Neramexane is a drug related to memantine, which acts as an NMDA antagonist and has neuroprotective effects. It is being developed for various possible applications, including treatment of tinnitus, Alzheimer's disease, drug addiction and as an analgesic. Animal studies have also suggested antidepressant and nootropic actions, so there are a wide range of potential applications this drug may be used for. It also acts as a nicotinic acetylcholine receptor antagonist.

A clinical trial found that doses of 50 mg and above safely improved tinnitus scores over 16 weeks.

See also 
 Arylcyclohexylamine

References 

Cyclohexylamines
Nicotinic antagonists
NMDA receptor antagonists